, Op. 36, (The silent serenade), is a German-language musical comedy by Erich Wolfgang Korngold to a libretto by Victor Clement. The style of the work is a mix of operetta and 1920s-style revue songs. The roles are written for eight singers and eight actors and the work is scored for a small chamber orchestra: two pianos, the first doubling on celesta, two violins, cello, flute, clarinet or saxophone, trumpet, and percussion. The plot is set in 1820s Naples. Korngold worked on the piece from 1946 to 1951, with a version (shortened from 180 to 100 minutes) being premiered by Radio Vienna in 1951. The full version was first staged in 1954 by Theater Dortmund to negative critical response.

Recordings
The recording of the shortened version by Radio Vienna in 1951 featured sopranos Hilde Ceska (Silvia), Rosl Schwaiger (Luise), Liane Synek, mezzo-soprano Tonja Sontis, contralto Hansi Schenk (Probierdamen), baritone  (Caretto), the actors Fred Liewehr (Andrea Cocle), Egon von Jordan (Benedetto), Franz Böheim (Borzalino), Susi Witt (Geschäftsführerin), Felix Dombrowsky (Carlo Marcellini), Herbert Hauk (Pater); conducted by the composer. Issued 2011 by Line Music (cantus classics, CACD 5.01371).

The first full-length recording was made in 2009 with Sarah Wegener, Birger Radde, Frank Buchwald, Werner Klockow, Young Opera Company, Holst-Sinfonietta, Klaus Simon recorded 2009, released by CPO 2011.

References

Operas by Erich Wolfgang Korngold
1951 operas
German-language operas
Operas